Bartragh Island is a sandy island and a townland located in Killala Bay, County Mayo, Ireland.

Geography 
The island is around 0.75 square miles (1.9 square kilometres) in area. It's located around a mile from the shore and, with low tide, can be reached on foot.

Demographics

Relevant places 
Bartragh belonged to Nick Faldo, an English golf champion who planned to build a private golf course on it.

Nature 
Bartragh island is a birdwatching site, well known for great skuas.

See also

 List of islands of Ireland

References

External links
 Bartragh Island entry on Mapcarta

Islands of County Mayo
Townlands of County Mayo